Yonatan Voltzok (in Hebrew יונתן וולצ'וק) is one of the most dominant trombone players on the Jazz scene today. He received his bachelor's degree at the New School in New York City. His debut album "More To Come" (2008), which featured Slide Hampton, Ali Jackson, Aaron Goldberg, Barak Mori & Antonio Hart was well received by many including "The Village Voice" magazine.

Discography

As Leader
 Two Spirits Dancing in the Dark (Outside In Music, 2018)
 More To Come (2008)

As Sideman
With Anat Cohen
Noir (Anzic, 2007)

With Fat Cat Big Band
Angels Praying for Freedom (Smalls Records, 2008)
Face (Smalls Records, 2009)
Meditations on the War for Whose Great God is the Most High / You are God (Smalls Records, 2009)

With Dan Aran
Breathing (Smalls Records, 2009)

With Assaf Hakimi
Some Other Day (2009)

With Eddie Henderson (musician)
Eddie Henderson & Friends Play The Music of Amit Golan (Minton's, 2012)

With Yuval Cohen
Hakol Zehavi - The Yuval Cohen Septet celebrates the music of David Zehavi (2014)

References

External links

Living people
Year of birth missing (living people)
American jazz trombonists
Male trombonists
The New School alumni
Jazz musicians from New York (state)
21st-century trombonists
21st-century American male musicians
American male jazz musicians